, known in English as The Man Who Can't Get Married, is a 2006 Japanese drama broadcast by Fuji TV. The theme song is "Swimmy" by Every Little Thing.

The drama was produced by Kansai Telecasting Corporation and Media Mix Japan.

Plot 
Shinsuke Kuwano (Abe Hiroshi), a successful architect at 40, enjoys living by himself. He doesn't like people but somehow is able to design wonderful houses for them.

Kuwano is incredibly socially awkward, to the point of being rude, however, he often means well, and is generally at a loss as to why he annoys people around him (which he does consistently). While he is a loner, he has regular contact with his family, his mother in particular is trying to get him married. His day to day contact with his long suffering employee Eiji (Tsukamoto Takashi) and business manager Maya Sawazaki (Takashima Reiko) is troublesome, they see him as awkward, but as he is the core talent of the business, they put up with his antisocial ways. This generally involves them placating clients and trying to cover for the fact he sometimes insults them without even realising it.

He has a routine of making himself a delicious dinner and then relaxing to classical music in his easy chair (he likes to pretend that he is the conductor). One night, he plays the music loud enough to make his next door neighbor, Michiru Tamura (Kuninaka Ryoko) knock on his door to complain. When Kuwano answers the door, he suffers  terrible stomach pain and collapses to the floor. Lucky for him, his neighbor Michiru is nice enough to accompany him to the hospital, where he is treated by Dr. Natsumi Hayasaka (Natsukawa Yui). He is really rude to Natsumi, but she is still determined to treat him.

Afterwards, Michiru and Natsumi become part of Kuwano's life. They make friends with Kuwano's colleagues Eiji  and Maya. While becoming friends they all enjoy talking about how strange and eccentric Kuwano is. As time goes by, they all see something in Kuwano, while Kuwano himself changes his habits and starts to slowly appreciate the people around him.

Additionally Kuwano has a rival architect, Kaneda, whom he despises, though he seems interested in his extravagant lifestyle. Kaneda, only seem to use the cover of an architect as a cover to get girls and impress people. This intrigues Kuwano, who constantly checks his website to see if Kaneda actually builds anything. Kaneda is an architect like Kuwano, and around the exact age, they are polar opposites.

Themes 

Many of the themes of Modern Japan, and cultural traditions are obvious in Kekkon Dekinai Otoko. Three of the characters are 30/40 somethings, who are not yet married. In Japan, this puts them "on the shelf". The show also deals with family expectations to have a relationship, and the lives of those who are lonely.

Episodes

Credits

Cast 
 Hiroshi Abe - Shinsuke Kuwano: the protagonist.
 Yui Natsukawa - Natsumi Hayasaka: physician, Shinsuke's personal doctor.
 Ryoko Kuninaka - Michiru Tamura: Shinsuke's neighbor, living in Shinsuke's next door which her uncle owns with her own pug "Ken", during her uncle's long absence overseas.
 Takashi Tsukamoto - Eiji Murakami: Shinsuke's assistant.
 Reiko Takashima - Maya Sawazaki: Shinsuke's friend as well as his job partner as an architect producer.
 SHEILA - Chizuru Nishimura: Michiru's friend, who always looks for boyfriends.
  - Mari Ozawa: A nurse working under Natsumi, whom Natsumi named as "in charge of smiles".
 Iku Takamatsu - Kazumi Emori: A nurse working under Natsumi.
 Rieko Miura - Keiko Nakagawa: Shinsuke's younger sister.
 Toshinori Omi - Yoshio Nakagawa: Shinsuke's brother-in-law (Keiko's husband), VP of the hospital Natsumi is working for.
 Sakura - Saori Yoshikawa: Eiji's girlfriend, working for Maya's office.
  - Hiroyuki Kaneda: An architect whom Shinsuke regards as a rival, owns a Toyota 2000GT, also a womanizer.
 Mitsuko Kusabue - Ikuyo Kuwano: Shinsuke's mother.
 Ayano Tachibana - Convenience store cashier.
 Hiroyuki Nishio - Video rental shop cashier.
  - Master carpenter.

Staff 
Producers - Kazuhisa Ando, Yuuji Tojo, Tatsuya Ito
Directors - Yoshishige Miyake, Takashi Komatsu, Hisashi Ueda
Screenwriter - Masaya Ozaki
Music - Kyo Nakanishi

External links 
 Official website - by Kansai TV

Japanese drama television series
2006 Japanese television series debuts
2006 Japanese television series endings
Fuji TV original programming
Kekkon Dekinai Otoko